Masianaka is a rural municipality in Madagascar. It belongs to the district of Vangaindrano, which is a part of Atsimo-Atsinanana Region. The population of the commune was estimated to be approximately 18,000 in 2001 commune census.

Only primary schooling is available. The majority 66% of the population of the commune are farmers.  The most important crops are rice and cloves, while other important agricultural products are coffee, cassava, sweet potatoes and pepper. Services provide employment for 1% of the population. Additionally, fishing employs 33% of the population.

Roads
Masianaka is situated on the East coast of Madagascar on the National road 12A, 30 km south from Vangaindrano.
The first ferry on the National road 12A in direction of Fort Dauphin is in this municipality.

Lake Masihanaka
Next to the town the Masianaka river forms the Lake Masihanaka (Farihy Masihanaka).

References

Populated places in Atsimo-Atsinanana